Antonio Arcari (born 8 May 1953) is a diplomat of the Holy See.

Biography
He was born on 8 May 1953 in Pralboino, province of Brescia, Italy. The Bishop of Brescia, Luigi Morstabilini, ordained him a priest on 11 June 1977. 
Pope John Paul II awarded him on 23 September 1980 the honorary title of chaplain to His Holiness (Monsignor).

On 18 July 2003, Pope John Paul II appointed him Titular Archbishop of Caeciri and Apostolic Nuncio in Honduras. Episcopal consecration was given to him by Cardinal  Angelo Sodano on 20 September of the same year; Co-consecrators were Archbishop Bruno Foresti, Bishop Emeritus of Brescia, and Giulio Sanguineti, Bishop of Brescia.

Pope Benedict XVI appointed him Apostolic Nuncio to Mozambique on 12 December 2008.

On 5 July 2014, Pope Francis appointed him Apostolic Nuncio in Costa Rica.

On 25 May 2019, Pope Francis appointed him Apostolic Nuncio in Monaco.

See also
 List of heads of the diplomatic missions of the Holy See

References

Living people
1953 births
20th-century Italian Roman Catholic titular archbishops
21st-century Italian Roman Catholic titular archbishops
Apostolic Nuncios to Mozambique
Apostolic Nuncios to Honduras
Apostolic Nuncios to Costa Rica
Apostolic Nuncios to Monaco